Valder is a surname. Notable people with the surname include:

John Valder (1931–2007), Australian politician
Henry Valder (1862–1950), New Zealand businessman

See also
Alder (surname)
IL Valder, a Norwegian sports club
Valders, Wisconsin village
Valdez (disambiguation)